William Fletcher Hall (22 March 1853 – 1 November 1911) was an English cricketer.  Hall's batting and bowling styles are unknown.  He was born at Lindfield, Sussex.

Hall made a single first-class appearance for Sussex against Gloucestershire at the County Ground, Hove in 1874.  Hall took the wicket of Edward Knapp in Gloucestershire's first-innings, finishing with figures of 1/57 from 25 overs.  In Sussex's first-innings, he was dismissed for a single run by Fred Grace.  Having made 231 in response to Gloucestershire's 381, Sussex were forced to follow-on and in their second-innings he was dismissed for 18 by W. G. Grace, with his the final wicket to fall in Sussex's total of 148.  Gloucestershire won by an innings and 2 runs.  This was his only major appearance for Sussex.

He died at East Grinstead, Sussex on 1 November 1911.

References

External links
William Hall at ESPNcricinfo
William Hall at CricketArchive

1853 births
1911 deaths
People from Lindfield, West Sussex
English cricketers
Sussex cricketers